Kharku (Punjabi: ਖਾੜਕੂ ,  ; khāṛakū, khaarakoo; literally meaning courageous, bold, brave, dreaded, feared, or domineering; alternatively spelt as Kharaku) is a Punjabi term used as a self-designation by Sikh militants of the Punjab insurgency who were followers of the Khalistan movement.

History 
During the later years of British India and early decades following Indian independence, some slogans were coined during those times which invoked the word Kharku to serve a political message, an example being "Khanda Kharku, Nehru Bhajju", meaning: "when Sikh swords begin to clatter, Nehru shall flee". The Kharkus fought an insurgency primarily between the years of 1978–1993, sparked by the 1978 Sikh-Nirankari clash, which led to the deaths of 13 orthodox Sikhs.

Their ultimate goal was the establishment of a sovereign Sikh state (Khalsa Raj) based upon political justice. The movement gained further strength in the 1980's after Operation Blue Star, Operation Woodrose, and Operation Black Thunder, and fallout from the assassination of Indira Gandhi, which sparked country-wide anti-Sikh pogroms. The Kharkus of the 1980's and 1990's were associated with martyrdom and respected as Shaheeds (martyrs for a religious cause). The Kharku movement was especially strong in rural areas of Punjab. The ranks of militants drew primarily from the Majha region from those belonging to a lower socio-economic status and Jat background.

They were generally supported by the Sikh masses, especially during the beginning of the insurgency. Support waned during the latter years until the movement faded, eventually relegated to the underground. The reasons for their decline are a lack of common vision, lack of a commitment to a worthwhile cause, and losing trust of the common folk. Hundreds of Kharkus were killed by police and military forces during the insurgency. Many of those who survive remain in hiding or have escaped abroad.

Terminology

Etymology 
Kharku is etymologically derived from the word 'kharag''' (honed), which originally referred to an iron scimitar.

 Other names 
They were also referred to as 'Kharku Singhs' or simply as 'Mundey' (boys). Other terms for them were 'Jujharu' (hardworker), 'Jangju Sikhs' (fighter), 'freedom fighters', and even 'Khalistani mujahideens'. Controversially, the term is also used by some to describe Sikh terrorists who indiscriminately massacred local Hindus and other innocent civilians. Kharkus viewed themselves as revolutionaries rather than as terrorists. The English-language media outlets and the government referred to the militants as 'Uggarwadi''' (ferocious).

Titles 
Kharkus took titles and names quite seriously and it was risky for media outlets to report on individual Kharkus without using their preferred terminology and honorifics. They were against being labelled as "militants" or "terrorists" ('dehshatpasand', 'dehshatgard, or 'atankawadi') and demanded that Sikh honorifical terms, such as "Bhai", "Sant", and "Sardar", be appended as prefixes when reporting their names. Journalists and editors who dared to not heed these demands put their life in danger.

See also 
 List of terrorist incidents in Punjab, India
 Timeline of the Punjab insurgency
 Khalistani groups
 Martyrdom in Sikhism
 Punjabi Suba movement
 Dharam Yudh Morcha
 Anandpur Sahib Resolution
 Sutlej Yamuna link canal
 Jarnail Singh Bhindranwale
 National Security Guard, commonly known as 'Black Cats'
 Khalsa bole

References

Further reading 
 
 

 
Nationalism in India
History of Punjab, India (1947–present)
Sikh politics
Religiously motivated violence in India
Sikh terrorism
Pro-Khalistan militant outfits